Talesh Sara (also Romanized as Ţālesh Sarā) is a village in Chehel Shahid Rural District, in the Central District of Ramsar County, Mazandaran Province, Iran. At the 2006 census, its population was 130, in 29 families.

References 

Populated places in Ramsar County